Institute of Science, Banaras Hindu University (ISc-BHU) is a constituent institute of Banaras Hindu University, Varanasi, India which offers courses in  Zoology, Botany, Biochemistry, Computer science, Geography, Mathematics, Physics , Geology , Geophysics , Chemistry, Statistics.

History

Faculty of Science was established in 1916 and in the month of December 2015 it was upgraded to Institute of Science.

Organization
Institute of Science's administrative head is a Director. The Director is responsible for all aspects of the Institute's operations, including budgets, administration, planning, support services, institute appointments, curricula and student affairs. The Director is appointed by an executive body and reports to the Vice-Chancellor of the university.
The Institute of Science keeps itself alive with regular academic activities like seminars, workshops, conferences. It is equipped with advanced and sophisticated laboratories. Faculty members have liaison with research institutions of repute in India and abroad. A large number of the teachers of the Institute have received distinctions and honors like Shanti Swarup Bhatnagar Prize, Jawaharlal Nehru Fellowship, FICCI Award, TIFR Fellowship etc. and several are fellows of the various academies.

There are six Centers and thirteen different Departments of which many are centres of advanced study and research in the Institute of Science that offer Undergraduate (UG), Postgraduate (PG)  and Doctoral Degrees in all the field of modern science.

Courses
The institute offers Undergraduate (B.Sc), Post graduate (M.Sc) and Newly added BCA course, Ph.D courses in various courses under the departments and centres in the institute. Also, it offers M.Sc. (tech) in Geophysics and MCA as well.

Journal of Scientific Research of the Banaras Hindu University 

The Journal of Scientific Research of the Banaras Hindu University is an open-access scientific journal. It is published since 1950 by the Institute of Science and is double-blind peer reviewed.

Research Centres
Centre for Brain  Research
Centre for Genetic Disorders
Centre for Hydrogen Energy
Centre for Nanotechnology
DST Centre for Interdisciplinary  Mathematical Sciences for computer science, Mathematics and statistics
Interdisciplinary Centre for Life  Sciences (a.k.a. DBT-BHU Interdisciplinary School of Life  Sciences)

Notable alumni
 C. N. R. Rao
 Jagdish Shukla
 Jayant Narlikar
 Kamalesh Chandra Chakrabarty
 Lalji Singh
 Satish K. Tripathi
 Shanti Swaroop Bhatnagar
 T. V. Ramakrishnan

See also
Banaras Hindu University
List of educational institutions in Varanasi

References

External links
 

Banaras Hindu University
University departments in India
Universities and colleges in Varanasi
Universities and colleges in Uttar Pradesh
Educational institutions established in 1916
1916 establishments in India